The surname Koehne may refer to:

History
"Koehne" is the North German variant of the name "Kuehne".

People 
 Bernhard Karl von Koehne (1817–1887), Russian heraldist and numismatist
 Bernhard Adalbert Emil Koehne (1848–1918), German botanist
 Graeme Koehne (born 1956), Australian composer

References

German-language surnames
de:Köhne